Danielle Brown MBE (born 10 April 1988) is a British competitive archer and award winning children's author. She has competed in the Paralympic Games winning gold medals in Beijing and London and has also won medals shooting in the able bodied category including the Commonwealth Games.

She was born in Steeton, West Yorkshire.

Career
Her first international competitive event was at the European Archery Championships (for athletes with disabilities) in Nymburk in 2006. She reached the semi-finals of the Compound Bow Open Class event, and was defeated by Gulbin Su of Turkey. She lost the bronze medal match to fellow British competitor Melanie Clarke.

She then took part in the IPC World Archery Championships in Cheongju in 2007. Competing in the Compound Bow Open Class event, she won gold with a score of 114 points (defeating Gulbin Su 116–107 in the semi-final, and Wang Li of China 114–108 in the final). She was also part of the British women's team which won gold in the team event in the Compound Bow Open Class, defeating Japan 221–199 in the final.

In 2008, Brown won silver (beaten by Gulbin Su in the final) in the Invitation Disabled Archery Event in Stoke Mandeville, then competed at the Paralympic Games in Beijing, where she won gold in the Women's individual compound, defeating Wang in the quarter-finals, Clarke in the semis, and Chieko Kamiya of Japan in the final (112–98). In 2009, she won a second successive individual gold medal, and a team gold, at the IPC World Archery Championships, followed in 2010 by three successive individual gold medals: at the Arizona Cup, at the Stoke Mandeville World Invitational Disabled Archery Competition, and at the European Para-Archery Championships.

She represented England in archery at the 2010 Commonwealth Games in Delhi, having qualified "after a two-day selection shoot in Coventry in June where she finished second behind world number one Nicky Hunt". She was "the first Paralympian to represent England in an able-bodied event at the Games", though cyclist Sarah Storey (who won two gold medals in cycling at the 2008 Paralympics) also competed against able-bodied athletes a few days later. She won a gold medal in the Women's Team Compound event, beating Canada 232–229 alongside team-mates Nicky Hunt and Nichola Simpson.

In 2011, she won an additional individual gold medal at the IPC World Championships in Turin, followed by two silver medals in the women's team event and the mixed team event.

In 2012, she won her second successive Paralympic Games gold medal, beating GB teammate Mel Clarke in the final at the Royal Artillery Barracks, London. That year she also won the Indoor World Cup in Nimes and got a silver medal at the World Cup Finals in Tokyo, both in the able-bodied category.

Brown was appointed Member of the Order of the British Empire (MBE) in the 2013 New Year Honours for services to archery. She is also one of many athletes to have had a postbox painted gold after the London Paralympics 

On 1 September 2013 Brown won the able-bodied British title with victory at the Archery GB National Series finals in Nottingham. She beat Lucy O'Sullivan 142–141 in the compound final.

In November 2013, World Archery announced that Brown would not be able to compete in Para-Archery contests (such as the 2016 Olympics) in the future as her disability did not have a direct and important impact on her archery performance. She appealed the ruling, but it was upheld in favour of World Archery. As of 1 April 2014, she is unable to compete in Para-Archery.

Brown competed at the 2015 able-bodied World Championships in Copenhagen. In 2017 she appeared on Christmas University Challenge on a team representing Leicester University.

Personal life 
Brown has Complex Regional Pain Syndrome (CRPS) in her feet, and competes sitting down on a stool. She was, at the time of the 2008 Paralympics, a law student at Leicester University, and subsequently achieved first class honours.
She was given an honorary degree of Doctors of Laws from the University of Leicester on Friday 25 January 2013
On 19 September 2013 Leicester University named the Danielle Brown Sports Centre after her.

On 22 September 2013 Brown was made a Freewoman of the district of Craven and on 1 July 2014 Brown was given the Freedom of the City of London. In 2019, Brown was inducted into the British University and College Sport's Hall of Fame.

Bibliography
Collins GCSE Revision Study Skills (2015) 
Be Your Best Self - Life Skills For Unstoppable Kids (2019)
Run Like A Girl - 50 Extraordinary And Inspiring Sportswomen (2021)
One Hundred Reasons To Hope (2021), curated on behalf of Captain Tom Moore.

Achievements

2006
4th, European Para Championships, individual, Nymburk
2007
 IPC World Championships, individual, Cheongju
 IPC World Championships, women's team, Cheongju
2008
 World Invitational Disabled Competition, individual, Stoke Mandeville
 Summer Paralympics, individual, Beijing
2009
 IPC World Championships, women's team, Nymburk
 IPC World Championships, individual, Nymburk
12th, Summer Universiade, individual, Belgrade
2010
 Arizona Cup, individual, Phoenix, Arizona
 Arizona Cup, mixed team, Phoenix, Arizona
 Arizona Cup, women's team, Phoenix, Arizona
 World Invitational Disabled Competition, individual, Stoke Mandeville
 European Para Championships, individual, Vichy
 Commonwealth Games, women's team, Delhi
 World Cup, women's team, Shanghai

2011
 IPC World Championships, individual, Turin
 IPC World Championships, women's team, Turin
 IPC World Championships, mixed team, Turin
2012
 Nimes Indoor World Cup – able bodied, Nimes, France
 Arizona Cup, women's team, Phoenix, Arizona
 World Cup, mixed team, Shanghai
 2012 Summer Paralympics, individual, London
 World Cup Final – able bodied, individual, Tokyo
2013
 UK National Series Champion, able-bodied, Nottingham
4th World Championships, women's team, able-bodied, Belek
 IPC World Championships, individual, Bangkok
 IPC World Championships, mixed team, Bangkok

2022
 Children's Sports Book of the Year, Sunday Times Sports Book Awards: Run Like A Girl

See also
 2012 Summer Olympics and Paralympics gold post boxes

References

External links
 
 
 

English female archers
Paralympic archers of Great Britain
Archers at the 2008 Summer Paralympics
Archers at the 2010 Commonwealth Games
Paralympic gold medalists for Great Britain
Alumni of the University of Leicester
People from the City of Bradford
1988 births
Living people
Commonwealth Games gold medallists for England
Archers at the 2012 Summer Paralympics
Members of the Order of the British Empire
Medalists at the 2008 Summer Paralympics
Medalists at the 2012 Summer Paralympics
Sportspeople from Yorkshire
Commonwealth Games medallists in archery
Paralympic medalists in archery
Medallists at the 2010 Commonwealth Games